Everett Gardiner Weeden Jr., or, Tall Oak, (September 4, 1936 – February 11, 2022) was an artist, activist, survivalist and historian of Mashantucket Pequot and Wampanoag descent. Tall Oak dedicated his life to the education and advocacy of Indigenous rights, and was a founding member of the National Day of Mourning in Plymouth, Massachusetts. 

Weeden's traditional name, Tall Oak, was given to him by Princess Red Wing, another prominent historian of Narragansett and Wampanoag descent, when he was sixteen years old. Tall Oak traced his surname to his ancestor Toby Weeden, a servant mentioned in the will of John Weeden, of Jamestown, Rhode Island, in 1735.

Early life and education 
Tall Oak was born in Providence, Rhode Island on September 4, 1936, and spent his early years growing up in North Providence, Rhode Island. In 1945, when he was about eight or nine years old, he moved to the Roger Williams Homes, a public housing project in South Providence. Tall Oak attended St. Michael's School, and eventually trained as an artist at Rhode Island School of Design, where he took classes from sixth grade through high school. He was awarded a scholarship after graduating from Central High School. 

In 1959, he moved to Washington County to help his cousin, Princess Red Wing, at the nascent Tomaquag Indian Museum. He lived in Charlestown, Rhode Island until his death in 2022.

National Day of Mourning, 1970 

In 1970, on the 350th anniversary of the Pilgrim landing at Plymouth Rock, Frank James, of the Aquinnah Wampanoag was asked by Governor Francis Sargent to write and give a speech at the ceremony. However, once James shared his speech with officials, they deemed it was "too aggressive and too extreme." This censorship angered local Indigenous people and helped to spark the creation of the National Day of Mourning. 

Inspired to act by the decision of the government officials, Tall Oak gathered several other Indigenous activists from the region including Frank James. The six originally planned their gathering to take place in Jamestown, Virginia, but later decided to hold it in Plymouth, Massachusetts, where the Mayflower landed and a statue of Ousamequin stands, overlooking Plymouth Harbor. Their biggest objective was to make sure the event remained peaceful, part of their mission was to enhance the relationships between Indigenous and non-Indigenous people on Cape Cod. 

The first National Day of Mourning was held on Thanksgiving 1970. Almost five hundred Native Americans from across the country gathered in support to hear James give a speech.

St. David's Island, Bermuda 
In the 1980s, Tall Oak began work to reconnect members of the Pequot diaspora, dispersed throughout the Atlantic Ocean following the slave trade that followed the Pequot War in first half of the 17th century. On St. David's Island in Bermuda, he helped to form the St. David's Island Indian Reconnection Committee, which acted as a lead proponent for learning more, and then orchestrating a more formal connection between the communities in Connecticut and Bermuda. This culminated in 2002 with the inaugural reconnection. Tall Oak was featured on the cover of St. Clair "Brinky" Tucker's St. David's Island, Bermuda: Its People, History and Culture (2009).

See also 
 Princess Red Wing
 Ella Sekatau
 Loren Spears

References

External links 
 Bristol Community College Native American Genocide Conference Panel featuring Tall Oak Weeden

1936 births
2022 deaths
20th-century Native Americans
21st-century Native Americans
Native American activists
People from Providence, Rhode Island
Pequot people
Wampanoag people